Vale (Portuguese meaning "valley") is a former civil parish in the municipality of Santa Maria da Feira, Portugal. In 2013, the parish merged into the new parish Canedo, Vale e Vila Maior. It has a population of 2,138 inhabitants and a total area of 9.01 km2.

References

Former parishes of Santa Maria da Feira